Melanolophia imperfectaria is a species of geometrid moth in the family Geometridae. It is found in North America.

The MONA or Hodges number for Melanolophia imperfectaria is 6622.

Subspecies
These two subspecies belong to the species Melanolophia imperfectaria:
 Melanolophia imperfectaria imperfectaria
 Melanolophia imperfectaria solida Rindge, 1964

References

Further reading

 

Melanolophiini
Articles created by Qbugbot
Moths described in 1860